Massimo Brambati (born 29 June 1966) is an Italian former footballer who played as a defender.

Club career
Brambati began his career at Torino, but he first established himself as a first-team footballer during a two-season loan spell at Empoli. He moved to Bari, whom he went on to captain, in 1989, winning the Mitropa Cup with the Italian club in 1990. He spent four seasons at the club before finishing his career with spells at Lucchese, Palermo, Ternana and Saronno.

International career
After representing the Italy under-21 side at the 1988 Under-21 European Championships, Brambati was also a member of the Italy under-23 olympic squad that reached the semi-finals of the 1988 Summer Olympics in Seoul, under Cesare Maldini, eventually finishing in fourth place.

After retirement
Following his retirement in 1999, Brambati has regularly appeared on the football show Diretta Stadio on 7 Gold.

Personal
Brambati was married to the Romanian model Catrinel Menghia.

Honours
Bari
Mitropa Cup: 1990

References

1966 births
Living people
Footballers from Milan
Italian footballers
Italy under-21 international footballers
Torino F.C. players
Empoli F.C. players
S.S.C. Bari players
S.S.D. Lucchese 1905 players
Palermo F.C. players
Ternana Calcio players
Serie A players
Serie B players
Olympic footballers of Italy
Footballers at the 1988 Summer Olympics
Association football defenders